William Donald MacGillivray (August 13, 1919 – September 13, 1994) served in the California State Assembly for the 36th district from 1969 to 1974. During World War II he also served in the United States Navy.
During the Reagan Administration, He served as an Member of the National Capital Planning Commission.
He also served as a Member on the National Highway Safety Advisory Committee also under Ronald Reagan.
He was a member of the Democratic party until 1962, then he became a Republican.

References

United States Navy personnel of World War II
Republican Party members of the California State Assembly
1919 births
1994 deaths